Stigmella muricatella is a moth of the family Nepticulidae. It is found in Greece and Turkey, the Near East, and east to the eastern part of the Palearctic realm.

The larvae feed on Sanguisorba minor muricata. They mine the leaves of their host plant. The mine starts as a very delicate corridor, but gets broader gradually over time. The mine follows the leaf margin eventually expanding over a good part of the leaflet. Small leaflets are completely mined out. Pupation takes place outside of the mine.

External links
Fauna Europaea
bladmineerders.nl

Nepticulidae
Moths of Europe
Moths of Asia
Moths described in 1978